Taylor G. Stanley (born May 30, 1991) is an American ballet dancer who is currently a principal dancer with the New York City Ballet.

Early life
Stanley was born in Philadelphia to a mixed-race family, and was raised in West Chester, Pennsylvania. At age three, they started learning ballet, tap, jazz and hip hop at The Rock School for Dance Education. Initially they thought they would pursue a career in commercial dance, but their parents and teachers encouraged them to focus on ballet. At age 15, Stanley attended a summer course at the Miami City Ballet School. Two years later, Stanley attended a summer intensive at the School of American Ballet in New York City, then was asked there and to train full time for a year. At the workshop performance of SAB, they performed George Balanchine's Stars and Stripes. They also received the Mae L. Wien Awards for Outstanding Promise that year.

Career
Stanley became an apprentice at the New York City Ballet in 2009, and joined the corps de ballet the following year. While they were still in the corps, they danced Romeo in Romeo and Juliet. Stanley received the Janice Levin Dancer Award in 2011–12, which is given to promising corps dancers of NYCB.
They were promoted to soloist in 2013 and principal dancer in 2016. They had dance lead roles in George Balanchine's and Jerome Robbins' works. For their debut in the title role of Apollo, Stanley was coached by Craig Hall, the first African-American dancer in the company to dance that role. They had also originated roles under choreographers such as Justin Peck, Lauren Lovette and Kyle Abraham. In 2019, Stanley won a Bessie Awards for Abraham's The Runaway.

Outside of New York City Ballet, Stanley danced with their colleague Troy Schumacher's side project, BalletCollective. They also took classes at Nederlands Dans Theater and studied Gaga at Batsheva Dance Company in Tel Aviv.

Personal life
Stanley is openly gay and uses they/them pronouns.

As of 2015, Stanley is pursuing a Bachelor of Arts degree through St. Mary's College of California's LEAP program.

Selected repertoire

Stanley's repertoire with the New York City ballet includes:
Apollo
Bournonville Divertissements (Ballabile from Napoli)
Carousel (A Dance)
The Four Seasons
"Emeralds" from Jewels
A Midsummer Night's Dream (Puck, Bottom)
The Nutcracker (Cavalier, Hot Chocolate)
N.Y. Export: Opus Jazz
Romeo + Juliet (Romeo)
Polyphonia
The Sleeping Beauty (Puss in Boots)
Square Dance
Swan Lake (Benno, Russian, Spanish)
Symphony in C (Third Movement)
The Times Are Racing
Year of the Rabbit

Created roles
Belles-Lettres
Capricious Maneuvers
Everywhere We Go
In Creases
Mes Oiseaux
The Most Incredible Thing (The *Creator)
New Blood
Not Our Fate
Rodeo: Four Dance Episodes
Odessa
Polaris
Principia
The Runaway
Scherzo Fantastique
The Shaded Line
The Shimmering Asphalt
SOMETHING TO DANCE ABOUT Jerome Robbins, Broadway to Ballet
ten in seven

Awards and honors 
2009: Mae L. Wien Award
2011–12: Janice Levin Award
2019: Bessie Award for Outstanding Performer

References

1991 births
Living people
American male ballet dancers
School of American Ballet alumni
New York City Ballet principal dancers
People from West Chester, Pennsylvania
Dancers from Pennsylvania
Bessie Award winners
21st-century American ballet dancers
LGBT dancers
LGBT people from Pennsylvania
Mae L. Wien Award recipients
Janice Levin Award dancers